Niamh Annette Whelan (born 26 July 1990) is an Irish sprinter She represented her country at two outdoor and one indoor European Championships.

International competitions

Personal bests

Outdoor
100 metres – 11.63 (+1.0 m/s, Novi Sad 2009)
200 metres – 23.30 (+1.3 m/s, Budapest 2010)
Indoor
60 metres – 7.48 (Belfast 2010)
200 metres – 23.86 (Sheffield 2010)

References

1990 births
Living people
Irish female sprinters
European Games competitors for Ireland
Athletes (track and field) at the 2019 European Games